A power box (USA) or feeder pillar (UK) is a cabinet for electrical equipment, mounted in the street and controlling the electrical supply to a number of houses in a neighborhood. A power box is simply a layman's term for a transformer, cutout enclosure, or other enclosure used in conjunction with underground electrical distribution. In the United States, they are often painted olive drab (an olive-like green color), gray or "sand", a light tan color.

See also
 Electric power distribution

External links

Electric power distribution